Mikko Karl Antero Ollikainen (born 24 November 1977 in Malax) is a Finnish politician currently serving in the Parliament of Finland for the Swedish People's Party of Finland at the Vaasa constituency..

References

1977 births
Living people
People from Malax
Swedish People's Party of Finland politicians
Members of the Parliament of Finland (2019–23)